The 2019 Texas Tech Red Raiders baseball team represented Texas Tech University during the 2019 NCAA Division I baseball season. The Red Raiders played their home games at Dan Law Field at Rip Griffin Park as a member of the Big 12 Conference. The team was led by 7th year head coach Tim Tadlock.

Previous season
The 2018 team finished the regular season with a 38–15 (15–9) record, finishing in 3rd place in the Big 12. The Red Raiders were eliminated from the Conference Tournament in game 3 after a 4–12 loss to West Virginia. For the NCAA tournament, the team defeated New Mexico and Louisville in the Lubbock Regional, then defeated Duke in game 3 of the Lubbock Super Regional and advanced to the College World Series. The Red Raiders defeated Florida in game 1, then lost to Arkansas in game 2 before being eliminated by Florida in game 3.

Roster

Schedule and results

"#" represents ranking. All rankings from D1Baseball on the date of the contest.
"()" represents postseason seeding in the Big 12 tournament or NCAA Regional, respectively.

NCAA tournament

Lubbock Regional

Lubbock Super Regional

College World Series

Rankings

2019 MLB draft

External links
2019 Team Roster

References

Texas Tech Red Raiders
Texas Tech Red Raiders baseball seasons
Texas Tech Baseball
Texas Tech
College World Series seasons